Alfred James Wiggin or A. J. Wiggin (1823–1883) was an American artist active in Massachusetts, known mainly for his painted portraits and landscapes. He lived in Gloucester and Boston. Examples of his work are in the collections of the Cape Ann Museum; Historic New England; Lafayette College; the Peabody Essex Museum; and the Sandy Bay Historical Society.

References

Further reading
 Janet Dwyer. The Portraits and Landscapes of Alfred J. Wiggin, 1823–1883. Gloucester, Mass.: Cape Ann Historical Assoc., 1980.

External links

 GenForum. Wiggin

1823 births
1883 deaths
19th-century American painters
American male painters
American portrait painters
Artists from Boston
Painters from Massachusetts
People from Gloucester, Massachusetts
19th-century American male artists